Trabitz is a municipality in the district of Neustadt an der Waldnaab in Bavaria, Germany.

Mayor

Carmen Pepiuk (born 1969) (CSU) is the mayor since May 2014. She was re-elected in 2020.

References

Neustadt an der Waldnaab (district)